The 2011 French Socialist Party presidential primary was the first open primary (primaires citoyennes) of the French Socialist Party and Radical Party of the Left for selecting their candidate for the 2012 presidential election. The filing deadline for primary nomination papers was fixed at 13 July 2011 and six candidates competed in the first round of the vote. On election day, 9 October 2011, no candidate won 50 percent of the vote, and the two candidates with the most votes contested a runoff election on 16 October 2011. François Hollande ultimately won the primary, defeating Martine Aubry.

Background 
After the Socialist Party presidential primary of 1995 and the Socialist Party presidential primary of 2006 restricted to active members of the French Socialist Party, the principle of a primary open to all supporters of the Left for the 2012 race for the presidency was approved by the members of the Socialist Party in October 2009.

The left-leaning think tank Terra Nova proposed the idea of an open primary for the Socialist Party in 2008, although the idea had also been pursued in the previous election cycle by Roger-Gérard Schwartzenberg of the Radical Party of the Left (PRG), who wrote a letter to the editor on 14 September 2004 for the newspaper Le Monde. Schwartzenberg later introduced a bill on 28 February 2006 in the National Assembly (lower chamber) which would have outlined rules for open partisan primaries in French presidential elections.

Involvement of Dominique Strauss-Kahn 
At the beginning of May 2011, Dominique Strauss-Kahn, at that time managing director of the International Monetary Fund (IMF), was the opinion polls' clear favorite to become the Socialist Party candidate for the 2012 French presidential election, as well as for winning the presidency itself. There was controversy over the so-called Porschegate affair when he was pictured stepping into a €100,000 Porsche car, giving rise to criticism of his affluent lifestyle and to accusations of "champagne socialism". Nevertheless, it seemed certain that he would return to France and bid for the presidency in 2012.

However, on 14 May 2011, Strauss-Kahn was arrested in New York on charges of the sexual assault and attempted rape of a hotel room attendant. He was obliged to resign his IMF post and it was accepted at the time that he could not be expected to take any part in the Socialist Party primary.

Nevertheless, on 1 July 2011, there came a marked sea-change in Strauss-Kahn's fortunes when he was released on his own recognizance from house-arrest and bail at a court-hearing requested by the prosecution. This followed a letter sent by the New York District Attorney to Strauss-Kahn's defence lawyers disclosing information about the room attendant which appeared to call into question her credibility.

Strauss-Kahn's release led to immediate speculation of an eventual return to politics, perhaps even participation in the primary. The Paris politician and advocate of gender equality Michèle Sabban asked that the primary be suspended to discuss the possibility of Strauss-Kahn's participation.

At 13 July 2011, the closing date for nominations, Strauss-Kahn had not declared his candidacy.

The charges against Strauss-Kahn were dismissed on 23 August 2011. The prevailing view in the media was that he nevertheless could not make an immediate return to politics and his chances of being nominated as the 2012 Socialist candidate were effectively dead. An opinion poll conducted by CSA on 23/24 August showed that 80% of the French people (77% among supporters of the Left) did not want Strauss-Kahn to contest the Socialist candidacy, while a majority further did not want him to play any part in the forthcoming presidential election or to participate in any eventual Socialist government.

On 18 September 2011, in a televised interview, Strauss-Kahn confirmed he would not be a candidate and would not play any role in the Socialist primaries.

Voting procedures

Calendar 
Nominations for the candidacy were opened on 28 June 2011 and closed on 13 July 2011, with first round election to take place on 9 October 2011 and potential second round election on 16 October 2011 (respectively 8 October 2011 and 15 October 2011 for French territories in the Americas and the Eastern Pacific).

Conditions 
Unlike previous Socialist Party primaries, this was the first primary to be open to the general public. In order to participate to the open primary, voters had to meet the following conditions:
 be registered in the French electoral lists before 31 December 2010 (or for French persons under 18: be 18 at the time of the 2012 presidential election, or be a member of Socialist Party (PS), Radical Party of the Left (PRG), Young Socialist Movement (MJS), or Young Radicals of the Left (JRG); foreigners will be able to vote if they are members of PS, PRG, MJS, or JRG);
 pay a contribution of minimum €1;
 sign a charter pledging to the values of the Left: "freedom, equality, fraternity, secularism, justice, solidarity and progress".

Candidates 
The following candidates participated in the open primary:

Campaign

First round 
The six candidates participated in three televised debates on 15 September, 28 September and 5 October 2011.

In the first round election day, around 2,700,000 voters cast their ballots: Hollande won 39 percent of the vote, followed by Aubry with 30 percent and Montebourg at 17 percent. Former presidential candidate Royal came in fourth place with 7 percent of the vote.

Second round 

On 9 October 2011, after the first results of the first round, Manuel Valls called his voters to cast their ballots in favor of François Hollande; on 10 and 12 October 2011, Jean-Michel Baylet and Ségolène Royal respectively announced they would support François Hollande. On 14 October 2011, Arnaud Montebourg did not instruct his voters how to vote, although he explained he would personally cast his ballot for Hollande.

François Hollande and Martine Aubry contested a runoff election on 16 October 2011, after a televised debate held on 12 October 2011. Almost 2,900,000 voters participated to the second round: François Hollande won the primary with around 57 percent of the vote, becoming the official candidate of the Socialist Party and its allies for the 2012 presidential election.

Results 

|- style="background-color:#E9E9E9;text-align:center;"
! rowspan="2" colspan="2" style="text-align:left" | Candidates
! rowspan="2" colspan="2" style="text-align:left" | Parties
! colspan="2" | 1st round
! colspan="2" | 2nd round
|- style="background-color:#E9E9E9;text-align:center;"
! width="60" | Votes
! width="30" | %
! width="60" | Votes
! width="30" | %
|-
| style="background-color:" |
| style="text-align:left;" | François Hollande
| style="text-align:left;" | Socialist Party
| PS
| 1,038,207
| 39.17%
| 1,607,268
| 56.57%
|-
| style="background-color:" |
| style="text-align:left;" | Martine Aubry
| style="text-align:left;" | Socialist Party
| PS
| 806,189
| 30.42%
| 1,233,899
| 43.43%
|-
| style="background-color:" |
| style="text-align:left;" | Arnaud Montebourg
| style="text-align:left;" | Socialist Party
| PS
| 455,609
| 17.19%
| colspan="2" rowspan="4" style="background-color:#E9E9E9" | 
|-
| style="background-color:" |
| style="text-align:left;" | Ségolène Royal
| style="text-align:left;" | Socialist Party
| PS
| 184,096
| 6.95%
|-
| style="background-color:" |
| style="text-align:left;" | Manuel Valls
| style="text-align:left;" | Socialist Party
| PS
| 149,103
| 5.63%
|-
| style="background-color:" |
| style="text-align:left;" | Jean-Michel Baylet
| style="text-align:left;" | Radical Party of the Left
| PRG
| 17,055
| 0.64%
|-
| colspan="8" style="background-color:#E9E9E9" |
|- style="font-weight:bold;"
| colspan="4" style="text-align:left" | Total
| 2,650,259
| 100%
| 2,860,157
| 100%
|-
| colspan="8" style="background-color:#E9E9E9" |
|-
| colspan="4" style="text-align:left" | Valid votes  ||  || % ||  || %
|-
| colspan="4" style="text-align:left" | Spoilt and null votes ||  || % ||  || %
|- style="font-weight:bold;"
| colspan="4" style="text-align:left" | Total
| 2,661,284
| 100%
| 2,879,147
| 100%
|-
| colspan="8" style="background-color:#E9E9E9" |
|-
| colspan="8" style="text-align:left" | Table of results ordered by number of votes received in first round, complete results on resultats.lesprimairescitoyennes.fr.
|}

See also 
 2012 French presidential election

References

External links 
  Official website
 Profiles of the principal candidates (BBC News)

Socialist Party
2012 French presidential election
Socialist Party (France)
Primary elections in France